was a  after Genkyū and before Jōgen. This period spanned the years from April 1206 through October 1207.

Change of era
 1206 : The new era name was created to mark an event or a number of events. The previous era ended and a new one commenced in Genkyū 3, on the 27th day of the 4th month of 1206.

Events of the Ken'ei era
 1206 (Ken'ei 1, 2nd month): Shōgun Sanetomo's standing at court was raised to the 2nd rank of the 4th class.
 1206 (Ken'ei 1, 7th day of the 3rd month): The emperor planned to pay a visit to the sesshō Kujō Yoshitsune, but in the night before this visit, an unknown assassin was introduced secretly into Yoshitune's house, and he was stabbed by a spear pushed up from below the floor. No one was able to discover the perpetrator. Yoshitsune was then aged 38 years. The sadaijin Konoe Iezane succeeded Yoshitsune as sesshō; and the dainagon Fujiwara no Tadatsune became sadaijin.
 1206 (Ken'ei 1, 12th month):  Konoe Iezane ceases to function as  sesshō (regent); and instead, he becomes kampaku (chancellor).

Notes

References
 Brown, Delmer and Ichiro Ishida. (1979). The Future and the Past: a translation and study of the 'Gukanshō', an interpretative history of Japan written in 1219.  Berkeley: University of California Press. ;  OCLC 5145872
 Kitagawa, Hiroshi and Bruce T. Tsuchida, eds. (1975). The Tale of the Heike. Tokyo: University of Tokyo Press. ; ; ; ;  OCLC 193064639
 Nussbaum, Louis-Frédéric and Käthe Roth. (2005).  Japan encyclopedia. Cambridge: Harvard University Press. ;  OCLC 58053128
 Titsingh, Isaac. (1834). Nihon Odai Ichiran; ou,  Annales des empereurs du Japon.  Paris: Royal Asiatic Society, Oriental Translation Fund of Great Britain and Ireland. OCLC 5850691
 Varley, H. Paul. (1980). A Chronicle of Gods and Sovereigns: Jinnō Shōtōki of Kitabatake Chikafusa. New York: Columbia University Press. ;  OCLC 6042764

External links
 National Diet Library, "The Japanese Calendar" -- historical overview plus illustrative images from library's collection

Japanese eras
1200s in Japan